In geography, a bight is a concave bend or curvature in a coastline, river or other geographical feature (such as a cliff), or it may refer to a very open bay formed by such a feature.  Such bays are typically broad, open, shallow and only slightly recessed.

Description
Bights are distinguished from sounds, in that sounds are much deeper. Traditionally, explorers defined a bight as a bay that could be sailed out of on a single tack in a square-rigged sailing vessel, regardless of the direction of the wind (typically meaning the apex of the bight is less than 25 degrees from the edges).

The term is derived from Old English byht ("bend, angle, corner; bay, bight") with German Bucht and Danish bugt as cognates, both meaning "bay". Bight is not etymologically related to "bite" (Old English bītan).

Notable examples 
 Bay of Campeche
 Bay of Plenty
 Bight of Benin
 Bight of Biafra or Bight of Bonny
 Canterbury Bight
 German Bight or Heligoland Bight
 Great Australian Bight
 McKenzie Bight
 Mecklenburg Bight
 Mid-Atlantic Bight
 New York Bight
 North Taranaki Bight
 Robson Bight
 Santa Monica Bay
 South Taranaki Bight
 Southern Bight
 Southern California Bight
 Trinity Bight, Newfoundland and Labrador

References

 
Bodies of water
Coastal and oceanic landforms
id:teluk